Marco Velo (born 9 March 1974 in Brescia) is a retired Italian professional road bicycle racer.

Professional career 
Velo, who started his career with Brescialat, is a talented time-trialist, winning the Italian National Time Trial Championship on three occasions—1998, 1999 and 2000. Since 2002, Velo has ridden as a domestique for Alessandro Petacchi, first at Fassa Bortolo. In 2005, Velo wanted to go join Matteo Tosatto at the Quick Step team, but in the end joined Petacchi at the Domina Vacanze team, but when that disbanded at the end of the year, they both moved to Milram at the start of 2006. For the 2008 season, Velo moved to join Tosatto at the Quick Step team after all.

Major results
In his career, Velo won:

1997
 stage, Giro del Trentino
1998
 Coppe della Nazioni
 stage, overall, points & combination competition GP Tell
 Firenze–Pistoia
  National Time Trial Championship
1999
 Firenze–Pistoia
 GP Llodio
  National Time Trial Championship
2000
  National Time Trial Championship
2006
 Trofeo Città di Borgomanero (with Fabio Sacchi)

Notes and references

External links 
Personal website 
Profile at Team Milram official website

Italian male cyclists
1974 births
Living people
Cyclists from Brescia